The Nuffield Department of Population Health (NDPH) of Oxford University is located at the Old Road Campus in Headington, Oxford, England. It is one of the largest departments within Oxford University's Medical Sciences Division. The head of department is Professor Sir Rory Collins.

History

The Nuffield Department of Population Health was formed from the merger of ten research units in the Medical Sciences Division in 2013, the majority of which were in the Department of Public Health which ceased to exist. These centres were the Cancer Epidemiology Unit (CEU); Centre for Health, Law and Emerging Technologies (HeLEX); Centre on Population Approaches for Non Communicable Disease Prevention (CPNP); Clinical Trial Service Unit (CTSU); the Ethox Centre; Health Economics Research Centre (HERC); Health Services Research Unit (HSRU); Medical Careers Research Group (MCRG); Medical Research Council Population Health Research Unit (MRC PHRU); and the National Perinatal Epidemiology Unit (NPEU). The department is named for Viscount Nuffield, a major benefactor in establishing medical sciences at the University in the 1930s.

Research
Research has focused on a broad range of public health science including the benefits of reducing meat intake, the efficacy of statins, and women's health through the Million Women Study. NDPH researchers, Michael Parker and Sara Wordsworth, contributed to Chief Medical Officer Sally Davies' 2016 annual report on genomics in health care systems.

There are over 500 research staff within NDPH.

Buildings
The department is currently based in two buildings on the Old Road Campus in Headington, Oxford:

 The Richard Doll Building (main building)
 The Big Data Institute (BDI)

The Big Data Institute opened in 2017 as a collaboration between NDPH and the Nuffield Department of Medicine. The BDI hosts the NDPH research groups Ethox and the Medical Research Council Population Health Research Unit.

References

External links
 Nuffield Department of Population Health website
 Medical Sciences Division website
 University of Oxford website

2013 establishments in England
Population Health
Medical research institutes in the United Kingdom
Population genetics organizations
Research institutes of the University of Oxford